The Cadomian Orogeny was a tectonic event or series of events in the late Neoproterozoic, about 650–550 Ma, which probably included the formation of mountains. This occurred on the margin of the Gondwana continent, involving one or more collisions of island arcs and accretion of other material at a subduction zone. The precise events, and geographical position, are uncertain, but are thought to involve the terranes of Avalonia, Armorica and Iberia. Rocks deformed in the orogeny are found in several areas of Europe, including northern France, the English Midlands, southern Germany, Bohemia, southern Poland and the southwest Iberian Peninsula. The name comes from Cadomus, the Latin name for Caen, northern France. L Bertrand gave the orogeny its name in 1921, naming it after Cadomus the Gaulish name for Caen in Normandy.  He defined the end as being marked by Lower Palaeozoic red beds.

The interpretation is that the belt was formed as oceanic crust subducted below the Armorica land mass in a similar way to the Andes.  Sediments deposited on the continental margin were pushed up onto the continent, at the same time as intrusions of calc-alkaline magmas occurred.

Basement
These are exposed on Guernsey and at Cape La Hague in Brittany. This is termed the Icartian succession. Sark also has a gneiss basement. Vidal et al. studied Strontium isotope ratios and concluded that the basement is not widely present below the Cadomian orogeny, and Rabu et al. argued that the existing surface gneiss are fragments detached from the African craton. However it is possible that a basement of gneiss exists at depth below Normandy and Brittany. This gneiss was formerly known as Pentevrian. However it is now known that the Pentevrian type rocks do not predate the Cadomian orogeny, and this name is no longer appropriate for the Icart Gneiss.

Brioverian
Brioverian sequence was deposited during or before the Ediacaran period .  Most of these sediments are mudstone, siltstone or sandstone, but there are also some conglomerate, phtanites (quartzite cemented with lime) and contaminated limestone.  These seem to be deposited in a submarine fan.  There are also acid and basic volcanics interbedded.  Some authors believe that there was an unconformity during the Brioverian succession, as there are phtanite stones in the upper parts believed to be eroded from the lower parts, but this is still inconclusive.

Foliated quartz diorite occur at Baie de St Brieuc, at Coutances, La Hague, Guernsey, Alderney and Sark. These are only roughly dated .

Partial melting has resulted in migmatites.  These form belts named after Saint-Malo, Dinan, and St Cast in north-east Brittany.  The Rance valley has a metamorphic sequence including phyllites, amphibolite, metatexites, and diatexites which have melted into granite.  Leucogranites and anatectic granites have been derived from sediments melting.  East Brittany and Lower Normandy contains the Mancellian batholith which consists of intrusions of granodiorite and granite.  These other plutons are derived from fractionally crystallized mantle melts.

At the Baie de St Brieuc and near Coutances in Manche and Trégor region there are pillow lavas, basalt erupted under water. In the Tregor region there are units called Tuffs de Tréguier and Ignimbrites de Lézardrieux.

The southern edge of the Gulf of Saint-Malo between Tregor and Cancale shows the deformational structures of the Cadomian Orogeny.  These are East-west to North East trending upright folding.  Schistosity is developed parallel to the axial plane of the folds.  Prehnite-pumpellyite facies to mid-amphibolite facies have been produced by metamorphism.  Movement was concentrated in shear belts such as at St Cast.  The movement on the belts was sinistral and horizontal.

During the orogeny the migmatite belts of north east Brittany were formed. Baie de St Brieuc and St Malo migmatites were deformed with the typical structure.

Post orogeny
After the orogeny, continental sediments were washed on top of the deformed Cadomian rocks. They include conglomerate and sandstone in Brittany, Jersey and Alderney. These post orogeny deposits were dumped from braided stream channels. The basins for these sediments followed the structural grain in the Cadomian Orogeny.

Models
There are two overall models for the formation of the Cadomian Orogeny.

Firstly by Jean-Pierre Brun & P. Bale that compression to the south west of a volcanic arc and back arc basin onto the edge of the continent at the St Malo and Mancellian regions  formed the orogeny. Crustal thickening took place afterwards.

Secondly P. J. Treloar considers that the North Armorican Massif was put together from a series of terranes , their joins are the shear zones.  The terranes are known as St Brieuc, St Malo and Mancellian terranes.  Deformation in this model is caused by oblique subduction and is strike-slip, but not crustal thickening.  The migmatite belts would then be explained by high heat flow in marginal basins.

References 

 Plant, J.A., Whittaker, A., Demetriades, A., de Vivo, B., Lexa, J., The Geological and Tectonic Framework of Europe in Salminen, R. (editor) (2005) Geochemical Atlas of Europe part 1, Espoo, Geological Survey of Finland. . Retrieved 2015-06-29.
 Avalonia and the Cadomian belt

Orogenies of Europe
Neoproterozoic orogenies
Neoproterozoic Europe